Kiersten White is an American author of fiction for children and young adults. Her first book, Paranormalcy, was published by HarperCollins in 2009.

Early life 
White was born in Utah in 1983 and graduated in 2004 from Brigham Young University, where she studied English. She lives with her family in San Diego, California.

Career 
White is a writer of young-adult fiction covering a variety of genres (fantasy, historical fiction, paranormal); she also wrote a middle-grade novel of funny fairy tales.

Awards and honors 
The Dark Descent of Elizabeth Frankenstein won the 2018 Bram Stoker Award in the Young Adult category. White's first novel, Paranormalcy (2009), debuted at #7 on the New York Times Best Seller list in the "Children's Books—Chapter Books" category. The Utah Book Awards presented White with the Young Adult book award in 2011. The book has garnered praise in the 2010 Librarian Preview. A subsequent work received mention on the Lone Star Reading List, Beanstalker and Other Hilarious Scary Tales (2017); And I Darken (2016) received mention on the 2017 Rainbow Book List

Awards

Recognitions

Bibliography

Standalone novels 
 The Chaos of Stars (2013; HarperTeen) – 
 Illusions of Fate (2014; HarperTeen) – 
 The Dark Descent of Elizabeth Frankenstein (2018; Delacorte Press) – 
 Hide (2022; Del Rey Books) –

Chapbooks 
 Reality No-Show (2016; Serial Box) – 
 The End of the Beginning (2016; Serial Box) –

Paranormalcy series

 Paranormalcy (2010; HarperTeen) – 
 Supernaturally (2011; HarperTeen) – 
 Endlessly (2012; HarperTeen) –

Mind Games series 
 Mind Games (2013; HarperTeen) – 
 Perfect Lies (2014; HarperTeen) – 
Novellas:
 0.5. Annie and Fia (2013; HarperTeen) –  (e-book)

The Conqueror's Saga 
 And I Darken (2016; Delacorte Press) – 
 Now I Rise (2017; Delacorte Press) – 
 Bright We Burn (2018; Delacorte Press) –

Camelot Rising 
 The Guinevere Deception (2019; Delacorte Press) – 
 The Camelot Betrayal (2020; Delacorte Press) – 
 The Excalibur Curse (2021; Delacorte Press) –

Sinister Summer 
 Wretched Waterpark (2022; Delacorte Press) –

Slayer (Buffy the Vampire Slayer universe) 
 Slayer (2019; Simon Pulse) – 
 Chosen (2020; Simon Pulse) –

Star Wars contributions 

 From a Certain Point of View:
 Eyes of the Empire (2020; Del Rey Books) – 
Padawan (2022; Disney-Lucasfilm Press) – ISBN 978-3833242571

Collections
 Beanstalker and Other Hilarious Scarytales (2017; Scholastic) –

Graphic novels 
 In the Shadows with Jim Di Bartolo (2014; Scholastic) –

Contributions to anthologies

References 

1983 births
Living people
Writers from San Diego
21st-century American women writers
21st-century American novelists
American women novelists
Novelists from California
Novelists from Utah
American writers of young adult literature
Women writers of young adult literature
American fantasy writers
Women science fiction and fantasy writers